Global Clean Energy Holdings (OTC:GCEH) is a Southern California-based renewable energy company with interests in the production and commercialization of non-food-based feedstocks used for the production of biofuels, biomass, and renewable chemicals. It was founded in 2007.

History
In 2008, GCEH purchased approximately 5,000 acres of farmland in Mexico’s Yucatan peninsula. The farm is a joint venture with Stewart A. Resnick and Selim Zilkha, two entrepreneurs with agricultural & alternative energy companies.

The company currently owns and manages two Jatropha farms in the Yucatán, the larger of the two, located in the county of Tizimin, is nearly 9000 acres. The other is a small, research-based farm located near the city of Mérida.

On April 1, Interjet completed the first Jatropha-based biofuel test flight in Mexico. The fuel was manufactured by Honeywell’s UOP LLC from oil produced by three Mexican Jatropha producers including Globales Energia Renovables, a wholly-owned subsidiary of Global Clean Energy Holdings.

In mid-2011, GCEH, Emerald Biofuels, and Honeywell's UOP LLC submitted a joint Renewable Fuel Standard pathway application to the U.S. EPA for Jatropha. A pathway is necessary for Jatropha-based renewable fuels to qualify for generating Renewable Identification Numbers (RINS) under the Energy Policy Act of 2005.

Two weeks after the U.S. EPA approved Camelina for RIN (Renewable Identification Number) generation under RFS2, Global Clean Energy announced its purchase of Sustainable Oils, LLC, in Camelina production and genetics. Completed on February 13, 2013, the acquisition was trumpeted by Honeywell's UOP LLC, Boeing, and other public and private bio-energy stakeholders.

Roundtable on Sustainable Biomaterials Certification
In November 2012, GCEH became the first company based in North America and the only biodiesel feedstock producer to achieve Roundtable on Sustainable Biomaterials (RSB) certification.

Richard Palmer, CEO of GCEH, is a former member of the RSB Board of Directors.

Center for Sustainable Energy Farming
In November 2010, GCEH formed the Center for Sustainable Energy Farming (CFSEF), a non-profit research institution dedicated to advancing the quality of plant-based feedstocks for biofuel production. It is fueled by socially responsible clean energy produced from Jatropha.

The Center‘s mission is to perform plant science research in genetics, breeding and horticulture, and further develop technologies to allow for the economic commercialization and sustainability of energy farms. The Center provides a common research platform to foster communication and cooperation among various national and international research institutions and organizations in the biofuel sector. From global economics, environmental and social perspective, this collaboration hope to contribute to the development of more productive energy farms capable of supplying large quantities of plant-based (non-food) oils to replace the use of fossil fuels. The goals of this initiative are to create jobs in the agri-business and alternative energy industries, expand the use of non-productive land, reduce global dependency on oil reserves, and contribute to the reduction of carbon emissions.

The Center is focused on developing high-yielding commercial varieties of Jatropha curcas through interdisciplinary research cooperation across multiple scientific disciplines.

References

External links 

 Official website:

Biodiesel producers
Biofuel in the United States